Dietrich von Bausznern (March 19, 1928 – January 20, 1980) was a German composer, cantor, organist and music teacher.

Bausznern was born in Rastenburg, East Prussia, now Kętrzyn in present-day Poland. He wrote more than 300 compositions in a wide variety of genres, yet concentrated on church music: religious concerts, cantatas, motets, choral music, and chamber music as well a youth opera and a funk opera.

In 1981, the "Baußnern-Vereins zur Förderung des musikalischen Schaffens Waldemar von Baußnerns," an organization dedicated to promoting awareness of the music of Waldemar von Baußnern, Bausznern's grandfather was founded. The society, which is located in Darmstadt, is now known as the Baußnern Gesellschaft.

Later life
For his services as a rejuvenator of Lutheran music as organizer and composer, Bausznern received numerous awards.

He died in Kirchzarten, Germany.

External links
list of references in the online catalog of the Staatsbibliothek zu Berlin
List of Works

German male composers
People of Hungarian German descent
Hungarian nobility
1928 births
1980 deaths
20th-century German composers
People from Kętrzyn
20th-century German male musicians
Academic staff of the Frankfurt University of Music and Performing Arts